The London and North Western Railway (LNWR) Waterloo Class  was a class of  steam locomotives that was also known as the Whitworth Class.

History
The locomotives were introduced by F. W. Webb in 1889 as replacements for the Samson class, and 90 examples were built up to 1896. 

The LNWR reused numbers and names from withdrawn locomotives, with the result that the numbering system was completely haphazard.

Thirty locomotives passed to the London, Midland and Scottish Railway at the 1923 grouping. They were given the power classification 1P, and renumbered 5080–5109. In addition, four other members of the class survived in departmental service.

Withdrawals had started in 1907, and the last was withdrawn in 1936. None were preserved.

Accidents and incidents

They were derailed and fouled the main line. Locomotive No. 418 Zygia was one of two hauling an express passenger train that collided with the wagons and was derailed. Fourteen people were killed and 48 were injured.
One person was killed.

List of locomotives

References

Waterloo
2-4-0 locomotives
Railway locomotives introduced in 1889
Standard gauge steam locomotives of Great Britain
Scrapped locomotives